Sean Patrick Duffy (born October 3, 1971) is an American politician, prosecutor, former sports commentator and reality television personality who is currently a co-host of The Bottom Line on Fox Business, as well as a contributor on Fox News. A member of the Republican Party, he previously served as the U.S. representative for Wisconsin's 7th congressional district from 2011 to 2019.

He first gained fame as a cast member on The Real World: Boston, 1998's Road Rules: All Stars and 2002's Real World/Road Rules Challenge: Battle of the Seasons, before going on to serve as district attorney of Ashland County, Wisconsin.

Early life
Duffy was born on October 3, 1971, in Hayward, Wisconsin, the tenth of 11 children of Carol Ann (née Yackel) and Thomas Walter Duffy. Duffy has a marketing degree from St. Mary's University, and a J.D. degree from William Mitchell College of Law.

Duffy started log rolling at age five and speed climbing (sprinting up 60 and 90 foot poles) at 13. He holds two speed-climbing titles.

Television career
In 1997, Duffy appeared on The Real World: Boston, the sixth season of the MTV reality television show, and on Road Rules: All Stars in 1998, where he met his future wife Rachel Campos. Duffy later appeared on Real World/Road Rules Challenge: Battle of the Seasons, which aired in 2002. Both appeared in a filmed segment on 2008's The Real World Awards Bash, while Duffy served as district attorney.

Duffy has been an ESPN color commentator for televised competitions and in 2003 appeared as both a competitor and commentator on ESPN's Great Outdoor Games. He was named Badger State Games Honorary Athlete of the 2004 Winter Games.

In December 2022 Duffy and Dagen McDowell were named co-hosts of The Bottom Line, a show on Fox Business which premiered on January 23, 2023.

Political career

2002–2008
Duffy, a Republican, was appointed Ashland County District Attorney in 2002 to succeed Michael Gableman by Governor Scott McCallum. He was reelected unopposed in 2002, 2004, 2006 and 2008.

Duffy was on the Republican slate of the 10 Wisconsin electors for the 2008 presidential election.

U.S. House of Representatives

Elections
2010

On July 8, 2009, Duffy announced his campaign for Congress in Wisconsin's seventh congressional district. Duffy was considered an underdog in the race until May 2010 when 15-term incumbent Democratic Representative Dave Obey announced that he would not seek re-election. Following Obey's announcement, Democratic State Senator Julie Lassa joined the race.

On June 4, 2010, Duffy announced his resignation from the position of Ashland County District Attorney to focus on the congressional race. The resignation was effective three weeks later and Duffy returned to work in his father's law practice. He won the race on November 2, 2010, in a nationwide wave of Republicans being elected to Congress.

Different sources attribute his victory to his ten-month head start on Lassa's campaign, his grassroots organization and fundraising, his experience as a district attorney, and voter discontent with the economy.

2012

Duffy was challenged by Democratic nominee Pat Kreitlow.

2014

Duffy was challenged by Democratic nominee Kelly Westlund.

Tenure
In 2011, Duffy voted to eliminate Davis-Bacon Act prevailing wage requirements for federal projects.

In March 2011, Duffy was criticized when a video published by the Polk County Republicans, showing a public town hall-style meeting in his district, was picked up by media commentators. In the video, made in the wake of the passage of a controversial state bill which would have effectively frozen the salaries of state employees, Duffy was asked about whether he would be willing to cut his own $174,000 salary. Duffy responded that he would only be willing to do so as part of a general round of salary cuts for government employees, and insisted that he was "struggling" to get by, despite his salary being nearly three times the average for Wisconsin residents.

On December 22, 2011, Duffy and fellow GOP House freshman Rick Crawford (Arkansas), published an open letter to Speaker Boehner, urging the leader to allow the House to vote on the Senate's two-month tax cut extension compromise.

In 2013, Duffy and Democratic House member Michael Michaud (Maine) introduced a resolution calling for government action to ensure that people be provided with paper-based information along with electronic.

Duffy was on the Select Investigative Panel on Planned Parenthood.

Duffy supported President Donald Trump's 2017 executive order to impose a temporary ban on entry to the U.S. to citizens of seven Muslim-majority countries. He stated that "President Trump is fulfilling a campaign promise to re-evaluate our visa vetting process so that the American people are safe from terrorism."

In January 2017, Duffy co-sponsored legislation that would end protection for grey wolves in the Endangered Species Act.

In February 2017, Duffy made controversial statements in an interview with CNN's Alisyn Camerota while discussing the topic of President Trump's immigration and travel ban, which focused on combating radical Islamist terrorists. When Camerota, referring to the Quebec City mosque shooting, asked why Trump made no public statement on the white terrorists who perpetrated that act, Duffy replied, "I don't know, there's a difference. You don't have a group like ISIS or al Qaeda that is inspiring people around the world to take up arms and kill innocents...That was a one off, Alisyn."

In July 2018, Duffy said that Europe, China, Canada and Mexico had committed "economic terrorism in a way" by placing retaliatory tariffs on the United States in response to tariffs enacted by the Trump administration.

Duffy resigned his seat effective September 23, 2019, to care for a newborn daughter with a heart defect.

Legislation sponsored
Duffy proposed legislation to replace the director of the consumer watchdog group, the Consumer Financial Protection Bureau (CFPB), with a five-person commission and removing the CFPB from Federal Reserve System oversight so that it "would go through the same funding process as other federal agencies." The Consumer Financial Protection Bureau would have been renamed the Financial Product Safety Commission. The bill also intended to make overturning the decisions about regulations that the new commission made easier to do. The bill gave the commission more room to get rid of policies that Duffy believes jeopardize the safety of the US banking system.

In December 2015, Duffy introduced legislation to establish a five-person financial oversight board over Puerto Rico (with members appointed by the White House) in exchange for allowing public entities in Puerto Rico access to Chapter 9 restructuring.

The American Conservative Union gave him a 78% evaluation in 2017 and Americans for Prosperity gave him an 88% evaluation in 2019.

Committee assignments
Duffy served on the House Committee on Financial Services. He was appointed Chairman of the Subcommittee on Oversight and Investigations in November 2014, taking over from Patrick McHenry. He was also a member of the Subcommittee on Capital Markets and Government-Sponsored Enterprises. He also served on the Subcommittee on Financial Institutions and Consumer Credit and the Subcommittee on Insurance, Housing and Community Opportunity.

Electoral history
 2018 race for U.S. House of Representatives – 7th District
 Sean Duffy (R), 60.2%
 Margaret Engebretson (D), 38.5%
 2016 race for U.S. House of Representatives – 7th District
 Sean Duffy (R), 62%
 Mary Hoeft (D), 38%
 2014 race for U.S. House of Representatives – 7th District
 Sean Duffy (R), 60%
 Kelly Westlund (D), 39%
 2012 race for U.S. House of Representatives – 7th District
 Sean Duffy (R), 56%
 Pat Kreitlow (D), 44%
 2010 race for U.S. House of Representatives – 7th District
 Sean Duffy (R), 52%
 Julie Lassa (D), 44%
 2008 race for District Attorney of Ashland County, Wisconsin
 Sean Duffy (R) (inc.)
 unopposed
 2006 race for District Attorney of Ashland County, Wisconsin
 Sean Duffy (R) (inc.)
 unopposed
 2004 race for District Attorney of Ashland County, Wisconsin
 Sean Duffy (R) (inc.)
 unopposed
 2002 race for District Attorney of Ashland County, Wisconsin
 Sean Duffy (R) (inc.)
 unopposed

Personal life
Duffy is a practicing Roman Catholic.

Duffy is married to Rachel Campos-Duffy, a fellow alumna of The Real World, and Fox News personality, whom he met when they were co-stars on Road Rules: All Stars. They lived in Ashland, Wisconsin when Duffy was District Attorney for that county. They moved to Weston, a suburb of Wausau, Wisconsin, in late 2011, in order for Duffy to be closer to an airport for his weekly commute to Washington, D.C., where he spent three or four days a week.

As of August 2019, Duffy and his wife have eight children, and were expecting their ninth that October. On August 26, 2019, Duffy announced that because he and his wife learned that their ninth child would experience health complications, including a heart condition, he was resigning from Congress, effective September 23.

Duffy's nephew, Erik Johnson, is an American ice hockey defenseman and alternate captain for the Colorado Avalanche.

References

External links

 Congressman Sean Duffy official U.S. House website
 Sean Duffy for Congress

 
 
 
 
 

1971 births
21st-century American politicians
Catholics from Wisconsin
District attorneys in Wisconsin
Living people
People from Ashland, Wisconsin
People from Hayward, Wisconsin
People from Marathon County, Wisconsin
Republican Party members of the United States House of Representatives from Wisconsin
Saint Mary's University of Minnesota alumni
The Challenge (TV series) contestants
The Real World (TV series) cast members
William Mitchell College of Law alumni
Fox News people